This Is How I Feel is a studio album by English disc jockey and record producer Mark Barrott, under the name of Future Loop Foundation. It was released by Pan-Kay Records on 7 July 2003.

Track listing
"Apres Ski"
"Sun Comes Filtering Thru"
"I Love Her More in Summertime"
"What's Your Name?"
"Freetown"
"Lucky Blue"
"Headphone Music"
"You & Me"
"My Movie Is Like Life"
"I Love Her More..., Pt. 3"
"When Night Becomes Day"
"The Boy with the Gun"

References

2003 albums